Septar Mehmet Yakub (known in Romanian as Septar Mehmet Iacub) (1904–1991) was a Crimean Tatar lawyer, thinker, spiritual leader of Tatars and Turks in Dobruja, Mufti of the Muslim community in Romania. He was a promoter of harmony and peace.

Biography
Yakub was born in 1904 in Azaplar, situated in the Tatar countryside west of Mangalia, a village known today by its official name Tătaru. He studied law at the University of Bucharest and he served in Constanța Bar Association. He backed the emigration to Turkey.

He served as Mufti through the entire Communist era in his country, between 31 December 1947 and 1990, being preceded by Mitat Rifat and succeeded by Ablakim Ibrahim. As head of the Muslim Cult, he was placed by Securitate under secret surveillance in operation "The Sultan" under allegations of insulting USSR and attempting to establish in 1950 a Muslim World Peace Organization.

During Nicolae Ceaușescu's years in office he represented the community in the Great National Assembly, now Parliament of Romania. He was friend with Justinian and Teoctist, Patriarchs of the Romanian Orthodox Church, and with Dr. Moses Rosen, Chief Rabbi of Romanian Jewry.

He had a good acquaintance with the Romanian culture and became one of Romania's important speakers on the international scene, a non official "ambassador" during his visits in Arab and Muslim countries.  He thought that "Israel and the Arabs must come together and talk peace directly."

In 1990, when the editors of Renkler Journal in Bucharest led by historian Tahsin Gemil created the Tatar movement based on ideas of cultural and linguistic uniformity, Mehmet Yakub opposed this project creating a movement with cultural diversity conservation views activating under the motto Tek niyet, mútenevviyet ("Unity in diversity").

Yakub died in 1991, in Constanța. His body is near his wife, Zeyneb, in Constanța Muslim Central Cemetery at: 44.173046, 28.622309.

Citations

Sources

External links

See also 
 Islam in Romania
 Crimean Tatars
 List of Crimean Tatars

1904 births
1991 deaths
Crimean Tatar lawyers
Crimean Tatar academics
Crimean Tatar muftis
Muftis of Romania
20th-century Romanian lawyers
Romanian pacifists
Romanian academics
Romanian Muslims
Romanian people of Crimean Tatar descent
People from Constanța County